Armutlu is a large town in the Kemalpaşa district of İzmir Province, Turkey, in Turkey's Aegean Region. It is one of five townships which have a municipality of their own constituted and which depend the district center of Kemalpaşa.

Populated places in İzmir Province
Towns in Turkey